Events from the year 1847 in France.

Incumbents
 Monarch – Louis Philippe I

Events
15 April - Bombardment of Tourane: French vessels dispatched by Admiral Cécille bombard Tourane (Da Nang in Vietnam) in response to the persecution of Roman Catholic missionaries.
21 December - Emir Abdelkader surrenders in Algeria and is imprisoned in France.
Jeweler Cartier established in Paris.

Births
15 January - Camille Doncieux, first wife of Claude Monet (died 1879)
23 March - Victor Besaucèle, ornithologist (d. 1924)
25 March - Fernand Lataste, zoologist (died 1934)
31 May - Jules Bourgeois, entomologist (died 1911)
16 June - Paul Alexis, novelist, dramatist and journalist (died 1901)
29 June - Charles Gide, economist and historian of economic thought (died 1932)
1 July -  Eugène Boullet, entomologist (died 1923)
14 July - Noël Ballay, explorer, colonial administrator and poet (died 1902)
22 July - Jean-Baptiste Bienvenu-Martin, Socialist leader and Minister (died 1943)
4 October - Louis Henri Boussenard, author of adventure novels (died 1911)
8 November - Jean Casimir-Perier, politician, fifth president of the French Third Republic (died 1907)
15 December - Gaston Floquet, mathematician (died 1920)
17 December - Michel-Joseph Maunoury, military leader (died 1923)
18 December - Augusta Holmès, composer (died 1903)

Deaths

January to June
3 February - Marie Duplessis, courtesan (born 1824)
4 February - Henri Dutrochet, physician, botanist and physiologist (born 1776)
15 February - Germinal Pierre Dandelin, mathematician, soldier, and professor of engineering (born 1794)
24 February - Alexandre Guiraud, poet and novelist (born 1788)
2 March - Jules, prince de Polignac, statesman (born 1780)
17 March - Jean Ignace Isidore Gérard, caricaturist (born 1803)
20 March - Mademoiselle Mars, actress (born 1779)
29 May - Emmanuel de Grouchy, Marquis de Grouchy, Marshal of France, (born 1766)
12 June - Pierre-Simon Ballanche, writer and philosopher (born 1776)

July to December
13 September - Nicolas Oudinot, Marshal of France (born 1767)
7 October - Alexandre Brongniart, chemist, mineralogist, and zoologist (born 1770)
16 October - Henri de Castellane, politician and nobleman (born 1814)
31 December - Princess Adélaïde of Orléans, adviser to brother Louis Philippe, King of the French (born 1777)

Full date unknown
Benjamin Nicolas Marie Appert, philanthropist (born 1797)

References

1840s in France